This is a list of government gazettes.

See also
List of British colonial gazettes

Notes

References

Lists of publications
Lists of newspapers

es:Diario oficial#Diarios oficiales diversos